Analytoceras is an extinct genus of cephalopod belonging to the Ammonite subclass that lived during the early Jurassic. Analytoceras, named by Alpheus Hyatt in 1900, is a lytoceratid and only member of the pleuroacanthitid subfamily Analytoceratinae, which has the same characters as its genus.

Shell characters: inner whorls constricted, middle with parabolic lines and conspicuous parabolic nodes, outer with sigmoidal flairs; adult body chamber with ventrolateral spines.

References

 W.J Arkell, B.Kummel, C.W. Wright, Systematic Descriptions, Mesozoic Ammonoidea, Treatise on Invertebrate Paleontology, Part L (1957) p L193.

Early Jurassic ammonites of Europe
Fossil taxa described in 1900